Vanda is a genus of the orchid family.

Vanda may also refer to the following:

Given name
 Princess Vanda (originally Wanda), a girl from Polish legend
 Vanda Baranović (born 1970), Croatian basketball player
 Vanda Briedienė (1932–2013), Lithuanian economist, politician, member of the Seimas
 Vanda Felbab-Brown, American expert on internal and international organized crime
 Vanda Godsell (1922–1990), English actress
 Vanda Gomes (born 1988), Brazilian sprinter
 Vanda Gréville (1908–1997), British film actress
 Vanda Hădărean (born 1976), Romanian gymnast
 Vanda Hybnerová (born 1968), Czech stage and film actress
 Vanda Juhász (born 1989), Hungarian javelin thrower
 Vanda Juknaitė (born 1949), Lithuanian writer and playwright
 Vanda Kravčionok (born 1969), Lithuanian politician 
 Vanda Lukács (born 1992), Hungarian tennis player
 Vanda Maslovska (born 1980), Ukrainian female weightlifter
 Vanda Pignato (born 1963), Brazilian-born Salvadoran lawyer, First Lady of El Salvador
 Vanda Scaravelli (1908–1999), yogi and yoga teacher
 Vanda Semerádová, Czech canoeist
 Vanda Sigurgeirsdóttir (born 1965), Icelandic former multi-sport athlete
 Vanda Skuratovich (1925–2010), Belarusian religious activist
 Vanda Symon (born 1969), New Zealand writer
 Vanda Vályi (born 1999), Hungarian water polo player
 Vanda Vitali, Canadian museum curator
 Vanda Wesenhagen (born 1958), Dutch cricketer

Surname
 Harry Vanda, an Australian singer and songwriter
 Matt Vanda (born 1978), American former professional boxer
 Nhim Vanda, Cambodian politician

Places
 Lake Vanda, a small lake in Antarctica
 Vanda, Savar Kundla, a village in Gujarat State, India
 Vanda Station, former Antarctic research base
 Vantaa, a municipality in Finland, known as Vanda in Swedish

Others
 Vanda (opera), an opera by Antonín Dvořák
 A brand name for tasimelteon, a drug for a circadian rhythm disorder affecting blind people who are unable to perceive light

Lithuanian feminine given names